{{Infobox venue
|name=Prifoods Stadium
|nickname=
|native_name=八戸市多賀多目的運動場 天然芝球技場 "プライフーズスタジアム"
|native_name_lang=
|fullname=
|former names=''Daihatsu Stadium (2016-2019)
|logo_image=
|logo_caption=
|image=Hachinoher-taga_stadium4.JPG
|image_size=
|image_alt=
|caption=
| image_map           = 
| pushpin_relief      = 1
|pushpin_map=Japan Aomori Prefecture#Japan Tohoku#Japan
|pushpin_mapsize=
|pushpin_map_caption=
|pushpin_label_position=
|address=
|location= Hachinohe, Aomori, Japan
|coordinates=
|type=
|genre=
|broke_ground=
|built=
|opened=2016
|renovated=
|expanded=
|closed=
|demolished=
|owner=Hachinohe Shicho
|operator=
|surface=
|scoreboard=
|production=
|cost=
|architect=
|builder=
|project_manager=
|structural engineer=
|services engineer=
|general_contractor=
|main_contractors=
|seating_type=
|capacity=5,200
|suites=
|record_attendance=
|dimensions=
|field_shape=
|acreage=
|volume=
|tenants=Vanraure Hachinohe
|embedded=
|website=Homepage
|publictransit=
}}
 is a football stadium in Hachinohe, Aomori, Japan. It was formerly known as Daihatsu Stadium. Since April 2019 it has been called Prifoods Stadium''' for the naming rights by Prifoods.

It is one of the home stadium of football club Vanraure Hachinohe.

Gallery

References

External links

Vanraure Hachinohe
Sports venues completed in 2016
2016 establishments in Japan
Sports venues in Aomori Prefecture
Football venues in Japan
Hachinohe